Fricis is a Latvian masculine give name. It is derived from the name Frīdrihs (a cognate of Frederick) and the associated name day is November 14.

Notable people named Fricis 
Fricis Apšenieks (1894–1941), Latvian chess master
Fricis Bārda (1880–1919), Latvian poet 
Fricis Dambrēvics (1906–?), Latvian football forward
Fricis Kaņeps (1916–1981), Latvian footballer
Fricis Laumanis (1910–1981), Latvian football defender 
Fricis Rokpelnis (1909–1969), Latvian poet and writer
Fricis Roziņš (1870–1919), Latvian Marxist revolutionary, publicist, essayist, columnist and one of the founders of the Communist Party of Latvia

Latvian masculine given names